Felo may refer to:

People
Felo Ramírez (1923-2017), Cuban sports announcer
Felo García (born 1928), Costa Rican architect, painter, and footballer
Rafael Batista Hernández, Spanish footballer
Felo Maldonado (1938-2010), Puerto Rican baseball player and scout
 (born 1952), Chilean troubadour and humorist

Other
Felo de se, English common-law concept applied against the personal estates of those who ended their own lives